Jenna Norodom (born 11 March 2012) is a Cambodian princess & a member of the Cambodian royal family. She is the grandniece of King Norodom Sihamoni, the second daughter of Norodom Bupphary and great granddaughter of the former King Norodom Sihanouk. She is affectionately known as Princess Jenna. Jenna is also an actress, singer, dancer, model, and Cellcard's Royal Brand Ambassador.

Biography 
Jenna Norodom was born on 11 March 2012 in Paris, France. She is the second daughter in the family, her mother is Princess Norodom Bophary and her father is French. She is a granddaughter of Prince Norodom Chakrapong and a great granddaughter of the late King Norodom Sihanouk. Her official title is "Neak Ang Mchas Ksatrey Norodom Jenna" in Khmer and "Princess Jenna Norodom" in English.

In 2015 when Jenna was three years old, she and her family returned to live in Cambodia. She studied five languages including her native Khmer, as well as English and French, .

Princess Jenna Norodom is currently represented by Space Creative Marketing as her Talent Management Company.

Achievements 

Royal Brand Ambassador of Cellcard Telecommunications Company (Cambodia).
Royal Brand Ambassador of Marie Regal (Indonesia).
Royal Brand Ambassador of R&F Properties (China).
Royal Brand Ambassador of Cambodia’s Dance Sport Federation (Cambodia)
Actress on CTN Television Drama Series.
Space Creative Marketing - Talent Management (Cambodia)

Filmography

Television series

See also 
House of Norodom
Family tree of Cambodian monarchs

References

External links 

 Six young Princes and Princesses of Cambodian Royal Family
 Princess Jenna Norodom announced as Cellcard’s Royal Brand Ambassador
Princess Norodom Jenna on Facebook
Princess Norodom Jenna on Instagram
Princess Norodom Jenna on YouTube

Cambodian princesses
House of Norodom
Living people
2012 births